Sardonic Wrath is the 10th studio album by the Norwegian black metal band Darkthrone. It was released 6 September 2004 by Moonfog Productions, and was the band's last album on that record label. It was also Darkthrone's last album recorded solely in the black metal style, with subsequent albums featuring stronger punk traits. However, Einar Sjursø observed in Terrorizer that "even if there is a certain punk attitude to the odd riff here and there" it is a case of "the diabolic duo [Fenriz and Nocturno Culto]...simply drawing more influences into the Darkthrone melting pot, turning them into crystalline Darkthrone riffs".

The entire album was leaked on the Internet beginning in April 2004, long before the September 2004 release date.

On the song "Hate Is the Law", vocals were performed by Fenriz and Apollyon.

This album is dedicated to the memory of Quorthon from Bathory.

The album was reissued by Peaceville Records in 2014. The reissue contained a bonus disc of commentary from Fenriz and Nocturno Culto.

Track listing

Personnel
Fenriz – drums, vocals on "Hate Is the Law"
Nocturno Culto – electric guitar, bass guitar, vocals
Apollyon – vocals on "Hate Is the Law"

References

Darkthrone albums
2004 albums
The End Records albums